
Gmina Radgoszcz is a rural gmina (administrative district) in Dąbrowa County, Lesser Poland Voivodeship, in southern Poland.

Villages
Gmina Radgoszcz contains the villages and settlements of Luszowice, Małec, Radgoszcz, Smyków and Żdżary.

Neighbouring gminas
Gmina Radgoszcz is bordered by the gminas of Czarna, Dąbrowa Tarnowska, Lisia Góra, Radomyśl Wielki, Szczucin and Wadowice Górne.

References
Polish official population figures 2006

Radgoszcz
Dąbrowa County